A representative office is an office established by a company or a legal entity to conduct marketing and other non-transactional operations, generally in a foreign country where a branch office or subsidiary is not warranted. Representative offices are generally easier to establish than a branch or subsidiary, as they are not used for actual "business" (e.g. sales) and therefore there is less incentive for them to be regulated.

They have been used extensively by foreign investors in emerging markets such as China, India and Vietnam although they do have restrictions through not being able to invoice locally for goods or services. Consequently, Representative Offices tend to be utilized by foreign investors in fields such as sourcing of products, quality control, and general liaison activities between the Head Office and the Representative Offices overseas. A representative office is known in France as a bureau de liaison.

By country

Ukraine 
Foreign companies on purpose to promote products or services in Ukraine, have the right to open a representative office. Offices are opened in order to promote (less for the purpose of direct and indirect sales) of goods and/or services of the company, through advertising campaigns, market research, distribution support, etc. Under Ukrainian law, Branches & Representative offices are established without constituting a separate legal entity. Ministry of Economy of Ukraine is the main authority to register representatives. Representatives may have a bank account (in local and foreign currency) and obtain a seal (emblem). Financing received from main office, is fully exempt from income tax if it was properly used by office (inc. salary, rent payment, advertising campaign, market research, etc).

Registration of representative offices and obtaining a certificate of registration is the basis to obtain a residence permit for foreign employees of representative office. Certificate of registration enables a temporary duty and value-added tax (VAT) free import in Ukraine of property and equipment required.

See also 
 De facto embassy

References 

Legal entities
Marketing